Malpighia  emarginata is a tropical fruit-bearing shrub or small tree in the family Malpighiaceae.

Common names include acerola cherry, Guarani cherry, Barbados cherry, West Indian cherry, and wild crepe myrtle. 
Acerola is native to Paraguay and Brazil in South America, Central America and southern Mexico, Puerto Rico, Dominican Republic and Haiti, but is now also being grown as far north as Texas and in subtropical areas of Asia, such as India.

Distribution
Malpighia emarginata is originally from Yucatán, and can be found in Mexico, Central America, the Caribbean, South America as far south as Peru and Colombia, and the southeast region of Brazil, and in the southernmost parts of the contiguous United States (southern Florida and the Lower Rio Grande Valley of Texas). In Florida, it can be grown in protected locations as far north as Cape Canaveral. It is cultivated in the tropics and subtropics throughout the world, including the Canary Islands, Ghana, Ethiopia, Madagascar, Zanzibar, Sri Lanka, Taiwan, India, Java, Hawaii, and Australia.

Production

Brazil 
Brazil is the largest producer of acerola worldwide. On 11,000 hectares, Brazil produces 32,990 tons of acerola per year. In order to preserve the genetic variability of acerola, the federal rural University of Pernambuco in Brazil established an "Acerola Active Germplasm Bank" in June 1998.

Growth conditions 
Acerola can be propagated by seed, cutting, or other methods. It prefers dry, well-drained, sandy soil and full sun, and cannot endure temperatures lower than 30 °F/ -1 °C. Because of its shallow roots, it has very low tolerance to winds. Furthermore, a sufficient water supply is advantageous for good growth and maximum yields of large fruits. This is especially important during fruiting and flowering. The optimal growth conditions are reached at a mean temperature of 26 °C and 1200–1600 mm of  rainfall annually.

Description

Acerola is an evergreen shrub or small tree with spreading branches on a short trunk. It is usually 2–3 m (6.6–9.8 ft) tall, but sometimes reaches 6 m (20 ft) in height. The chromosome number is 2n = 40.

Bark 
The bark of young branches is green and sparsely covered with curly-haired trichomes, which fall off with age. The greyish to brownish bark is relatively smooth and covered with conspicuous cork pores when young. With age, it is thick and cracked.

Leaves
They are attached oppositely on the stem on short petioles. The leaves have small hairs, which can irritate skin.

Flowers

The flowering of the tree happens from April to November. They have five pale to deep pink or red fringed petals, 10 stamens, and six to 10 glands on the calyx. The three to five flowers per inflorescence are sessile or short-peduncled axillary cymes.

Fruits and Seeds

Three years after planting, trees start producing fruits. 3–4 weeks after flowering, a number of bright red drupes 1–3 cm (0.39–1.18 in) in diameter with a mass of 3–5 g (0.11–0.18 oz) mature. The shell of the fruit is smooth and very thin. Its shelf life of 2–3 days at ambient temperature makes it highly perishable. Drupes are in pairs or groups of three, and each contains three triangular seeds. The drupes are juicy and high in vitamin C (300–4600 mg/100g)[12] and other nutrients. They are divided into three obscure lobes and are usually acidic to subacidic, giving them a sour taste, but may be sweet if grown well.

Cultivation methods

Yield and harvest 
Acerola flowers and fruits already in the first year after planting but increases its  production in the following years, reaching up to 47 kg/per plant in the sixth year. The fruiting season usually extends from April to November. The fruits should be picked frequently, as they are not stored on the tree. Ripe fruit should be handled carefully to avoid bruising and should be utilized as soon as possible or frozen for later use. Semi-ripe fruit will usually keep for several days in the refrigerator. Pollination by wild insects increases the fruit yield.

Sowing 
Plants can be set at any time of the year, but the best time is spring, just before the rainy season. Choose a location with good water drainage and in a sheltered spot.

Pests and diseases 
Malpighia emarginata is a host plant for the caterpillars of the white-patched skipper (Chiomara asychis), Florida duskywing (Ephyriades brunneus), and brown-banded skipper (Timochares ruptifasciatus). Larvae of the acerola weevil (Anthonomus macromalus) feed on the fruits, while adults consume young leaves.

Nutritional values 
Acerola fruit is 91% water, and 8% carbohydrates, and contains negligible protein and fat (table). The fruit also supplies manganese at 29% DV, while other micronutrients are uniformly low in content (table). In 100 grams (3.5 oz) reference amount, acerola fruit provides an exceptional content of vitamin C at some 20 times the Daily Value (DV) (table). Whereas the content of sugar, soluble solids and titratable acids increases, the vitamin C content decreases with the ripening process of the fruit. Therefore, the immature green fruit is harvested for industrial use of the vitamin C. Besides the high vitamin C content, acerola also contains phytonutrients like phenolic acids, flavonoids, anthocyanins, and carotenoids.

Uses

Others
Acerola is a popular bonsai subject because of its small leaf and fruit, and fine ramification. It is also grown as an ornamental and for hedges. Because acerola also contains pigments like anthocyanins and carotenoids, it could also be used as a food colorant.

References

External links

University of Florida: Acerola

emarginata
Flora of Central America
Flora of Colombia
Flora of Ecuador
Flora of French Guiana
Flora of Florida
Flora of Guerrero
Flora of Hidalgo (state)
Flora of Nuevo León
Flora of Oaxaca
Flora of Peru
Flora of San Luis Potosí
Flora of Suriname
Flora of Tamaulipas
Flora of Venezuela
Flora of Veracruz
Flora of the Caribbean
Flora of the Rio Grande valleys
Flora of the Yucatán Peninsula
Medicinal plants
Plants described in 1824
Trees of Îles des Saintes
Tropical fruit
Flora without expected TNC conservation status